Mohan is a given name and surname. Notable people with this name include:

Sole name
 Mohan, another name for Krishna, a major Hindu deity
 Mohan (actor) (born 1956), Kollywood film actor
 Mohan (director), Indian director of Malayalam films
 Mohanlal (born 1960), South Indian film actor
 Crazy Mohan (1952–2019), Tamil comedy actor, script writer and playwright

Given name
Mohan Agashe (born 1947), Indian actor
Mohan Babu (born 1950), born Manchu Bakthavatsalam Naidu, actor, producer, politician from Andhra Pradesh
Mohan Baidya, chairman of the Communist Party of Nepal Revolutionary Maoist
Mohan Bam (born 1991), Nepalese judoka
Mohan Bhagwat (born 1950), Indian veterinary doctor and the current Sarsanghachalak of Rashtriya Swayamsevak Sangh
 Mohan Bhandari (1937–2015), Indian film and television actor
Mohan Chand Sharma (1965–2008), Indian Police Inspector who served in the Delhi Police, Special Cell
Mohan Choti (1939–1992), Indian film actor
Mohan Das, more commonly known as Lotan Baba (or "rolling saint"), an Indian holy man promoting peace by rolling his body along the ground when he travels
Mohan Dharia (1925–2013), Indian lawyer, Union minister, and social worker
Mohan Ellawala (1948–2009), governor of Sabaragamuwa Province in Sri Lanka from October 2, 2008 up until his death in 2009
Mohan al-Furayji, Iraqi Army general who planned the 2008 operation against militias in Basra
Mohan Galot (born 1945), Kenyan businessman
Mohandas Karamchand Gandhi (1869–1948), better known as Mahatma Gandhi, Indian revolutionary, President of the Indian National Congress
Mohan Gokhale (1954–1999), Indian film, television and theater actor who has worked in art films such as Sparsh, Bhavni Bhavai and Mirch Masala
Mohan Krishna Indraganti, Telugu film director from India
Mohan Jena (born 1957), member of the 14th Lok Sabha of India representing the Jajpur constituency of Orissa, and a member of the Biju Janata Dal political party
Mohan Joshi (born 1945), Indian actor
Mohan Kanda (born 1945), Indian Administrative Service officer and a member of the National Disaster Management Authority
Mohan Kapoor (born 1965), Indian actor
G. Mohan Kumar (born 1955), Indian Administrative Service and former Defence Secretary and Defence Production Secretary of India
Mohan Kumar (director) (1934–2017), Indian film director
Mohan Kumar (serial killer) (born 1963), Indian killer called "Cyanide Mohan"
Mohan Kumaramangalam (1916–1973), Indian politician and communist theorist who was a member of the Indian National Congress, and later, the Communist Party of India
Mohan Lal Grero, Sri Lankan educationist and politician, currently a member of the Provincial Councillor of the Western Province
Mohan Lal Jhikram (1919–2010), leader of Indian National Congress from Madhya Pradesh, India
Mohan Lal Kashmiri (1812–1877), Indian spy, diplomat, and author
Mohan Lal Sukhadia (1916–1982), Indian political and social leader, Chief Minister of Rajasthan 1954–1971
Mohan Maharishi, Indian theatre director, actor and a playwright
Mohan Munasinghe, Sri Lankan physicist
Mohan Patel (born 1952), field hockey player from New Zealand, member of the team that won the gold medal at the 1976 Summer Olympics in Montreal
Mohan Kumar Raja (born 1996), Indian sprinter
Mohan Rakesh (1925–1972), major figure of 20th-century Hindi literature
Mohan Rawale (born 1948), member of the 14thLok Sabha of India representing the Mumbai South Central constituency of Maharashtra and a member of the Shiv Sena (SS) political party
Ram Mohan Roy (1774–1833), founder of Brahmo Samaj, a 19th-century spiritual and religious reformation
Mohan Sharma, Indian film actor in Malayalam films of Chattakari fame
Manmohan Singh (born 1932), Prime minister of India
Mohan Singh (general) (1909–1989), Indian military officer and member of the Indian Independence Movement
Mohan Singh (1945–2013), Indian politician, former general secretary of the Samajwadi Party
Mohan Bikram Singh (born 1935), often referred to as MBS, party name Gharti, a Nepalese politician
Mohan Singh Kohli (born 1931), Indian mountaineer
Mohan Sinha Mehta (1895–1986), founder of Vidya Bhavan group of institutions and Sewa Mandir in Udaipur in Rajasthan
Mohan Singh Oberoi (1898–2002), Indian hotelier, founder and chairman of Oberoi Hotels & Resorts
Mohan Sithara (born 1959), Malayalam film music composer in Kerala
Mohan Sivanand (born 1951), Indian journalist and artist
Mohan Upreti (1925–1997), Indian theatre director, playwright and a music composer, considered one of the pioneers in Indian theatre music

Surname
 A. G. Mohan (born 1945), Indian yoga teacher, yoga therapist and author
 Ananthula Madan Mohan (1931–2004), Indian politician
 Balaji Mohan (born 1987), Indian film director
 C. Mohan (born 1955), American computer scientist and IBM Fellow
 Chander Mohan, former Deputy Chief Minister of Haryana State in India
 Chander Mohan (journalist) (born 1946), Indian journalist
 Chandra Mohan (disambiguation), several people
 Chinta Mohan (born 1954), member of the 14th Lok Sabha of India representing the Tirupathi constituency of Andhra Pradesh, and a member of the Indian National Congress
 Dominic Mohan (born 1969), British journalist originally from Bristol, England
 Duvvasi Mohan, Telugu comedian
 Earl Mohan (1889–1928), American film actor of the silent era. He appeared in 50 films between 1915 and 1927
 John Mohan (born 1939), American bridge player
 Keith Mohan (born 1935), English cricketer who played for Derbyshire in the County Championship in 1957 and 1958
 Kim Mohan (born 1949), American author and editor
 Mac Mohan (1938–2010), Indian character actor in Hindi language films
 Madan Mohan (disambiguation), several people
 Manjima Mohan (born 1993), Indian film actress
 Monica Mohan, American artist
 Murali Mohan (born 1940), South Indian film actor, producer and politician
 N. M. Mohan (1949–2012), Indian comics writer
 Narendra Mohan (1934–2002), Indian industrialist, chairman and managing director of the Rs 874-crore Jagran Prakashan publisher for India's largest selling Hindi newspaper Dainik Jagran
 Neal Mohan, CEO of YouTube since February 2023
 Nicky Mohan (born 1970), English former professional footballer who played in defence
 Pantam Gandhi Mohan, Indian politician
 Radha Mohan (born 1965), Tamil movie director
 Raja Mohan, Indian academic, journalist and foreign policy analyst
 Rakesh Mohan (born 1948), Indian economist and former Deputy Governor of Reserve Bank of India
 Ram Mohan (born 1931), veteran in the Indian animation industry
 Saira Mohan (born 1978), fashion model of Indian, Irish and French heritage
 Saranya Mohan (born 1989), Indian film actress who has acted in Malayalam and Tamil films such as Yaaradi Nee Mohini and Vennila Kabadi Kuzhu
 Shweta Mohan (born 1985), Indian playback singer who has sung in Malayalam, Tamil, Telugu and Kannada languages, daughter of Sujatha Mohan
 Sujatha Mohan (born 1964), Indian playback singer who has sung in Malayalam, Tamil, Telugu, and Hindi movies
 Swati Mohan, Indian-American aerospace engineer
 Vinu Mohan (born 1985), Indian actor in Malayalam cinema, son of actress Sobha Mohan

Sinhalese masculine given names